The women's individual compound competition at the 2019 European Games was held from 21 to 26 June 2019 at the Olympic Sports Complex in Minsk, Belarus. 16 archers entered the competition.

Ranking round
The ranking round took place on 21 June 2019 to determine the seeding for the knockout rounds. It consisted of two rounds of 36 arrows, with a maximum score of 720.

Elimination round

References

Women's individual compound